S'busiso Romeo Nkosi (born 21 January 1996 is a South African professional rugby union player for the South Africa national team and the  in United Rugby Championship. His regular position is winger.

Rugby career

2012–2014 : Youth rugby – Pumas and Golden Lions

Nkosi was born and grew up in Barberton. In 2012, his local  team called him up to represent them at the Under-16 Grant Khomo Week tournament, where Nkosi made three appearances.
He attended Barberton High School till Grade 10 there after moving to Johannesburg to attend Jeppe High School for Boys, where he earned selections in the ' Under-18 Craven Week team in both 2013 and 2014. He scored a try in the unofficial final of the 2013 tournament in Polokwane, but his side fell short, losing 29–45 to Western Province.

2015–2016 : Sharks, UKZN Impi and South Africa Under-20

His try-scoring exploits saw him finish as his side's top try scorer, and joint-sixth overall in Group A of the competition, in a disappointing season for the Sharks that saw them finish bottom of the log.

In March 2016, Nkosi was included in a South Africa Under-20 training squad, and made the cut to be named in a reduced provisional squad a week later. He started in their opening match in Pool C of the tournament as South Africa came from behind to beat Japan 59–19. He also started their other two pool matches as South Africa were beaten 13–19 by Argentina in their second match, but bounced back to secure a 40-31 bonus-point victory over France in their final pool match to secure a semi-final place as the best runner-up in the competition. Nkosi suffered a thigh injury which ruled him out of the remainder of the competition, so he didn't feature in the semi-final – where they faced three-time champions England, with the hosts proved too strong, knocking South Africa out of the competition with a 39–17 victory – or their final match, the third-place play-off against Argentina. Argentina beat South Africa for the second time in the tournament, convincingly winning 49–19 to condemn South Africa to fourth place in the competition.

Nkosi was included in the Sharks' squad for the 2016 Currie Cup Premier Division, but did not get any game time, instead making three appearances for the  team in the 2016 Under-21 Provincial Championship. At the end of October 2016, he was included in the  Super Rugby squad for the 2017 season.

Nkosi was named in South Africa's squad for the 2019 Rugby World Cup. South Africa went on to win the tournament, defeating England in the final.

Honours
 Currie Cup winner 2018

References

External links
 
 

1996 births
Living people
People from Barberton, Mpumalanga
South African rugby union players
Rugby union wings
Sharks (Currie Cup) players
South Africa Under-20 international rugby union players
South Africa international rugby union players
Sharks (rugby union) players
Rugby union players from Mpumalanga
Bulls (rugby union) players
Blue Bulls players